Hpa-An District (Phlone ;) is a district of the Karen State in Myanmar. It consists 5 towns and 1490 villages. 
2014 population was  783,510.

Townships
The district contains the following townships:
Hpa-an Township
Hlaingbwe Township
Thandaunggyi Township

External links
 Hpa-an District

 Hpa-an District

References 

Districts of Myanmar
Kayin State